The Museum Planning Area is a planning area located in the Central Area of the Central Region of Singapore. The area plays a "bridging role" between the Orchard area and the Downtown Core, which necessitates proper transport networks for vehicles, pedestrians and public transport. Due to the sheer size of green areas in the district, the Urban Redevelopment Authority (URA) has designated it a 'green lung' in the Central Area. However, the Museum Planning Area is also home to cultural and commercial activities. Around 65% of the area is available for future development, making it a hotbed for new infrastructure and buildings.

Museum planning area is bounded by the planning areas of Newton and Rochor to the north, the Downtown Core to the southeast, Singapore River to the south, River Valley to the west and Orchard to the northwest.

History

Ten national monuments are located within the Museum Planning Area, namely the Armenian Church, the Cathedral of the Good Shepherd, Cathay Building (now The Cathay), the Central Fire Station, the House of Tan Yeok Nee, the MacDonald House, the Old Tao Nan School (Peranakan Museum), the National Museum of Singapore, the Old Hill Street Police Station and the Singapore Art Museum/Former Saint Joseph's Institution. The area is home to significant events such as the Battle of Singapore and MacDonald House bombing. 

Other historical sites include:

YMCA Building
National Theatre
United Chinese Library

Geography

The Museum Planning Area is bordered by Rochor to the northeast, the Downtown Core to the southeast, the Singapore River Area to the southwest, River Valley to the west and Newton and Orchard to the northwest. The area is roughly bounded by Hill Street, River Valley Road, Clemenceau Avenue and Bras Basah Road. It is the smallest urban planning area, with an area of 83 hectares.

Parks and open spaces take up a third of the area of the Museum Planning Area, and include Fort Canning, Istana Park and Bras Basah Park, which can be used for recreational purposes. Collectively, these places will form the so-called 'green lung' of the Central Area. Terraces have been proposed to allow for "a more prominent and convenient access" to the Fort Canning area.

Institutions
The Museum Planning Area is Singapore's "institutional hub", with 11% of land set aside for institutional use and reserve sites to be safeguarded for future institutions. The many museums in the area, which give the Museum District its name, include the National Museum of Singapore, the Singapore Art Museum, the Asian Civilisations Museum, the National Archives of Singapore and the Singapore Philatelic Museum.

The arts scene is vibrant in the area, with The Substation, the Singapore Calligraphy Centre, the YMS Arts Centre and the Singapore Dance Ensemble all located within its boundaries. Scattered throughout the area are places of worship such as churches, mosques, Hindu temples and synagogues. The Registry of Marriages and the sprawling Singapore Management University campus are also located in the area.

Residential development
Despite its prime location, residential projects were only allocated 1% of the land area, and the Museum Planning Area was criticised for lacking residential zoning. Due to the lack of residents, there were fears that the area would become a "ghost town" at night. Furthermore, the concept of living within the Central Area had gained popularity, and up-market skyscraper condominiums could be built. The greenery of the Museum Planning Area could provide a peaceful environment for living.

The URA replied that several plots of land had been sold for residential-commercial mixed use, and that more housing developments were to be planned and constructed. The URA emphasised the importance of the area as a transition between the central business district and shopping areas, as well as the green, pedestrian-friendly nature of the URA's plan for the area.

Commercial development
The Museum Planning Area is home to various shopping malls, including Park Mall, Plaza Singapura, The Cathay, Singapore Shopping Centre and The Atrium @ Orchard. More vacant land will be set aside for commercial uses, especially around Dhoby Ghaut MRT station and Bras Basah MRT station. These will be properly integrated and connected with the respective stations.

Hotels in the area include Bayview Hotel Singapore and Hotel Rendezvous. Furthermore, a hotel development at the foot of Fort Canning Hill near the junction of Clemenceau Avenue and River Valley Road is in the planning stages, and is meant to be a retreat from urban living "amidst lush greenery". Other developments are planned on reserved sites near Fort Canning, but details have not been released.

Transport

The Museum Planning Area is served by four Mass Rapid Transit (MRT) stations: Dhoby Ghaut, Bras Basah, Fort Canning and Bencoolen The North South Line and the North East Line can only be accessible from Dhoby Ghaut while the Circle Line can be accessible from both and the Downtown Line can be accessible from Fort Canning and Bencoolen. The Central Expressway's Chin Swee Tunnel also passes under the area.

Roads

Improvements
Several changes to the road network in the area will be implemented, including the construction of Fort Canning Tunnel and the realignment of Stamford Road and Handy Road. The rationale for the improvements is increased traffic from Marina Centre and relieving the traffic congestion along Orchard Road. Furthermore, a new road network has been put in place to ensure smooth traffic flow after the full development of land around the MRT Stations.

Major roads
Armenian Street
Bras Basah Road
Central Expressway
Clemenceau Avenue
Fort Canning Tunnel
Hill Street
Orchard Road
Queen Street
River Valley Road
Stamford Road
Victoria Street

Pedestrian linkages
The Development Guide Plan for the Museum Planning Area envisages "a comprehensive pedestrian network linking developments, parks and open spaces". New promenades and pedestrian malls are planned for the area to enhance and connect existing sidewalks. A web of underpasses and covered walkways will link Orchard, the Singapore River, Raffles City and Marina Centre.

References

External links
Planning Area Map (Central Area)

 
Places in Singapore
Museum districts
Art gallery districts